Allen Memorial Medical Library is located along Euclid Avenue on the campus of Case Western Reserve University in Cleveland, Ohio. Completed in 1926, the building was named in honor of Dr. Dudley P. Allen.  Designed by the Cleveland firm of Walker and Weeks in a classical revival style, it was constructed with Indiana limestone on a pink Georgia marble base.  It was listed in the National Register of Historic Places on 1982-11-30 and is a Cleveland Landmark. Along with serving as a library, the building's 450 seat auditorium serves as classroom for students of Case Western Reserve University.

In addition to housing a portion of the Cleveland Health Sciences Library (CHSL), it is also home of the Dittrick Museum of Medical History. The building is managed by the Cleveland Medical Library Association (CMLA) in a partnership with Case Western Reserve University.

Historic uses 
Library

References

External links

Allen Memorial Medical Library

Library buildings completed in 1926
University and college academic libraries in the United States
Buildings and structures in Cleveland
Case Western Reserve University
Libraries on the National Register of Historic Places in Ohio
Medical libraries
National Register of Historic Places in Cleveland, Ohio
Libraries in Cuyahoga County, Ohio
University Circle